

Group A

Head coach:

Head coach:

Head coach:

Head coach:

Group B

Head coach:

Head coach: Jan Pieszko

Head coach:Rui Cacador

Head coach:Jorg Weibel Hans

Group C

Head coach:Paul Erik Bech

Head coach:

Head coach:

Head coach:

Group D

Head coach:

Head coach: Boris Ignatiev

Head coach:Juan Santisteban

Head coach:

Footnotes

UEFA European Under-17 Championship squads